Marinelli is a surname of Italian origin, and may refer to:

Anthony Marinelli (born 1959), American pianist, musician, composer and conductor
Benny Marinelli (1902–1927), American thoroughbred horse racing jockey
Carlos Marinelli (born 1982), Argentinian footballer
Chris Marinelli (born 1987), former American football offensive tackle
Danielle Roy Marinelli, Canadian politician
Danko Marinelli (born 1987), Croatian alpine skier
Giancarlo Marinelli (1915–1987), Italian basketball player
Giovanni Marinelli (1879–1944), Italian Fascist political leader
Jacques Marinelli (born 1925), French cyclist
Joe Marinelli (born 1957), American actor
Karl von Marinelli (1745–1803), Austrian actor, theatre manager and playwright
Leonardo Marinelli, Italian commander for the Guardia di Finanza 
Leonidas D. Marinelli (1906–1974), Argentinian American radiologist and inventor
Louis J. Marinelli (born 1986), American political activist of the California independence movement
Luca Marinelli (born 1984), Italian actor
Matthew Marinelli (born 1985), American professional wrestler
Paolo Marinelli (born 1995), Croatian professional basketball player
Rod Marinelli (born 1949), American football coach
Sonny Marinelli (born 1967), American actor and voice actor
Vincenzo Marinelli (1820–1892), Italian painter

See also
Marinelli Beaker
Marinelli Creek
Marinelli Field
Marinelli Glacier
Marinelli Bell Foundry, Italy's pontifical foundry, founded in 1339
Farinelli (disambiguation).